The S. G. Ball Cup is a junior rugby league football competition played predominantly in New South Wales, between teams made up of players aged under 19. Teams from Canberra and Melbourne (Victoria Thunderbolts) also participate. Prior to the COVID-19 pandemic in New South Wales teams from Perth (West Coast Pirates) and Auckland (New Zealand Warriors) also participated. The competition is administered by the New South Wales Rugby League. The competition includes both junior representative teams of NRL and NSW Cup clubs that do not field a team in the NRL competition.

The S. G. Ball Cup is named after S. G. "George" Ball, one of the five people responsible for the formation of the South Sydney Rabbitohs, and who was club secretary for over fifty years.

Clubs
In 2023, 16 clubs fielded teams in the NSWRL S G Ball Cup. 
 Balmain Tigers
 Canberra Raiders
 Canterbury-Bankstown Bulldogs
 Cronulla-Sutherland Sharks
 Illawarra Steelers
 Manly-Warringah Sea Eagles
 Newcastle Knights
 New Zealand Warriors
 North Sydney Bears
 Parramatta Eels
 Penrith Panthers
 South Sydney Rabbitohs
 St George Dragons
 Sydney Roosters
 Melbourne Storm
 Western Suburbs Magpies

In 2020, 18 clubs fielded teams in the NSWRL S G Ball Cup. After the sixth round on March 14 & 15, the 2020 competition was suspended and subsequently cancelled due to the COVID-19 pandemic in Australia. The three teams from 2020 that did not return in 2021 were:
 Central Coast Roosters
 West Coast Pirates

Previous teams that participated in the SG Ball Cup include: Gold Coast Titans (2008–09), Melbourne Storm (2009–14), Newtown Jets (1970s, early 1980s & 2009), Western Sydney Academy of Sport (2007–17).

S. G. Ball Cup Premiers

1965 to Current

 U16/s from 1965 until 2005
 U18/s from 2006 until 2020
 U19/s from 2021 onwards

Premiership Tally 

Bold means the team still currently play in the competition.

See also
Harold Matthews Cup
Laurie Daley Cup
Mal Meninga Cup
Rugby League Competitions in Australia

References

 
Rugby league competitions in New South Wales
Recurring sporting events established in 1965
1965 establishments in Australia
Sports leagues established in 1965
Junior rugby league